I Was Here is the fourth studio album released by Hubert Wu. It is available for pre-order on 8 December 2017, and released on 19 December 2017.

Track listing

Music videos

Hong Kong chart performance

Awards and nominations

Promotions 
On 18 December, he was interviewed by SmarTone.
On 19 December, there would be a one-day manager campaign, and the first 200 fans who buy the album can get poster with autograph. He also attended interviews from CP Jobs, MOOV and Metro International to promote his new album.

References 

Hubert Wu albums
2017 albums